Weissella oryzae  is a Gram-positive bacterium from the genus of Weissella which has been isolated from fermented Japanese rice from Tochigi Prefecture in Japan.

References

 

Bacteria described in 2013
Weissella